Saint-Cirgues-la-Loutre is a commune in the Corrèze department in central France.

Geography
In the south of the Corrèze department, in the Xaintrie, the commune of Saint-Cirgues-la-Loutre is bordered to the south-east by the Maronne river, and crossed by its tributary the Glane d'Ancèze (or Glane de Malesse). It is bordered by Cantal and the Auvergne-Rhône-Alpes region. The village of Saint-Cirgues-la-Loutre, located at the intersection of the D13 and D111 roads, is located thirteen kilometres east of Argentat. The municipality is also served by the D111E2 road.

Population

History
During the French Revolution, following a decree by the National Convention, the commune changed its name to Cirgue-l'Eyge. In 1919, the commune of Saint-Cirgues took the name of Saint-Cirgues-la-Loutre.

See also
Communes of the Corrèze department

References

Communes of Corrèze